Augusta is an album by the country singer Willie Nelson and the big band singer Don Cherry. It was released in 1995 on Sundown Records. The title track is about the Masters Tournament.

Track listing 
"My Way" - 4:18
"Augusta" - 2:46
"One for My Baby (And One More for the Road)" - 4:09
"Red Sails in the Sunset" - 2:53
"Try a Little Tenderness" - 4:21
"Tangerine" - 3:08
"I Love You for Sentimental Reasons" - 2:55
"Prisoner of Love" - 2:50
"Tenderly" - 3:34
"Maybe You'll Be There" - 4:15
"Don't Go to Strangers" - 3:23
"Night Life" - 2:35
"Rainy Day Blues" - 3:05

Personnel 
Willie Nelson - Guitar, vocals
Jay Orlando - Saxophone, soloist
Charlie Shaffer - Piano, arranger

References

1995 albums
Willie Nelson albums